David Jacob Oliver (born April 7, 1951) is a former infielder and coach in Major League Baseball, and is currently a member of the scouting department for the Kansas City Royals. He attended Cal Poly in San Luis Obispo, California. While playing for the Mustangs from 1970–73, Oliver collected 226 hits, batted .320 and with 706 at bats ranked second to fellow Mustang Ozzie Smith.  

Oliver originally signed with the Cleveland Indians in 1973 after being selected in the third round of the June draft, and his only trial in the Major Leagues consisted of seven games with the 1977 Indians. He batted 22 times, collecting seven hits, including a triple, three runs batted in, and four bases on balls. His batting average was .318. He returned to the Cleveland farm system and played through 1980, then became manager of the Indians' Batavia farm club in the Short Season Class A New York–Penn League in 1981–82. The following year, he joined to the Rangers for the first time, as manager of their Tri-Cities affiliate in the Short Season-A Northwest League. Then, in 1984, he became the Rangers' roving minor league infield instructor. In 1985–86, he returned to managing, this time at the Triple-A level, as pilot of Texas' top affiliate, the Oklahoma City 89ers of the American Association, leading them to a first-place finish in the Association's Western Division in 1985.

He was then promoted to the Major Leagues as a coach for the Rangers (1987–94) and the Boston Red Sox (1995–96), working as a third-base coach after 1987 under managers Bobby Valentine, Toby Harrah and Kevin Kennedy.

In , he was listed by the Rangers as special assistant for player development.

References

 Boston Red Sox 1996 media guide.

External links
 Baseball Reference

   
   

1951 births
Living people
Baseball players from Stockton, California
Boston Red Sox coaches
Cal Poly Mustangs baseball players
California Polytechnic State University alumni
Cleveland Indians players
Kansas City Royals scouts
Major League Baseball second basemen
Major League Baseball third base coaches
Minor league baseball managers
Memphis Chicks players
Oklahoma City 89ers players
Portland Beavers players
Reno Silver Sox players
San Antonio Brewers players
Tacoma Tigers players
Tacoma Tugs players
Texas Rangers coaches
Tiburones de La Guaira players
American expatriate baseball players in Venezuela
Toledo Mud Hens players
Anchorage Glacier Pilots players